The Tour du Haut Var is an early-season two-day road bicycle race in the Var department region in the south of France. Until 2008 it was run as a one-day race, part of the UCI Europe Tour. In 2009, the race transformed to a 2.1 event, raced over two days. Dutchman Joop Zoetemelk and France's Arthur Vichot hold the record with three wins.

The Tour du Haut Var is one of several stage races held in the hilly Provence-Alpes-Côte d'Azur region in February, alongside the Étoile de Bessèges, La Méditerranéenne and the Tour La Provence. These early-season races are competed mainly by French teams and are considered preparations for Paris–Nice, the first European World Tour event in March.

Winners

References

External links
 

 
UCI Europe Tour races
Recurring sporting events established in 1969
1969 establishments in France
Cycle races in France